Zaczyk is a surname. Notable people with the surname include:

Klaus Zaczyk (born 1945), German footballer
Stanisław Zaczyk (1923–1985), Polish actor
Teodor Zaczyk (1900–1990), Polish fencer

Polish-language surnames